|}

The Prix Sigy is a Group 3 flat horse race in France open to three-year-old thoroughbreds. It is run over a distance of 1,200 metres (about 6 furlongs) at Chantilly in April.

History
The event is named after Sigy, a successful French-trained sprinter in the late 1970s. It was established in 2004, and initially held Listed status.

The Prix Sigy was promoted to Group 3 level in 2015. The promotion was part of a restructured programme for three-year-old sprinters in Europe.

Records
Leading jockey (2 wins):
 Christophe Lemaire – Dolma (2004), War Officer (2008)
 Christophe Soumillon – Aiboa (2009), The Brothers War (2013)
 Olivier Peslier – Gusto (2012), Suesa (2021)

Leading trainer (3 wins):

 Francois Rohaut - Signs of Blessing (2014), Big Brothers Pride (2019), Suesa (2021)

Leading owner (2 wins):
 Joseph Allen – War Officer (2008), The Brothers War (2013)

Winners

See also
 List of French flat horse races

References

 Racing Post:

 galopp-sieger.de – Prix Sigy.
 ifhaonline.org – International Federation of Horseracing Authorities – Prix Sigy (2019).
 pedigreequery.com – Prix Sigy – Chantilly.

Flat horse races for three-year-olds
Chantilly Racecourse
Horse races in France
2004 establishments in France
Recurring sporting events established in 2004